Freeport is an unincorporated community in northeastern Winneshiek County, Iowa, United States.

History
A post office was established in April 1854, and remained in operation until being discontinued in November 1905. 

William H. Strayer (1866-1946), Oregon state senator and lawyer, was born in Freeport.

Education
The community is within the Decorah Community School District. Decorah High School in Decorah is the designated high school.

References

Unincorporated communities in Winneshiek County, Iowa
Unincorporated communities in Iowa